The Fanniidae are a small (285 species in five genera) group of true flies largely confined to the Holarctic and temperate Neotropical realms; there are 11 Afrotropical species, 29 Oriental, and 14 Australasian.

Adults are medium-sized to small and usually have mainly dark body and leg colours. Males congregate in characteristic dancing swarms beneath trees; females are more retiring in habit. Larvae are characterised by their flattened bodies with striking lateral protuberances, and live as scavengers in various kinds of decaying organic matter.

The lesser housefly Fannia canicularis is a worldwide synanthropic species.

Fanniidae are indicators useful in forensic entomology.

Identifying characteristics
The Fanniidae were once a subfamily of Muscidae from which they may be distinguished by:

A (strictly) dorsal bristle is on the hind tibia below the middle and in addition to the dorsal preapical.
The axillary vein is strongly curved towards the wingtip, so if extended, the axillary and anal veins would meet before reaching the wing tip.
In males, the middle tibia has an erect pubescence beneath; in females, the frontalia is without crossed bristles, the frontal orbits are broad, and convex towards median line of frons, and two pairs of strong upper orbital bristles are present, with the anterior pair turned outwards.

Notes

References

Identification
References to identify the family include:
Chillcott, J.G. 1961. "A revision of the Nearctic species of Fanniinae (Diptera: Muscidae)". Can. Entomol. Suppl. 14, 295 p. Keys to Nearctic genera and species. Excellent figures.
Willi Hennig Muscidae in Erwin Lindner: Die Fliegen der Paläarktischen Region,7 (63b) 1-1110. Out of date, but good keys and figures.
Lyneborg, L. 1970. "Taxonomy of European Fannia larvae (Diptera, Fanniidae)". Stuttg. Beitr. Naturkd. 215, 28 p.
Rozkosny, R.; Gregor, F.; Pont, A.C. 1997. "The European Fanniidae (Diptera)". Acta Sci. Nat. Brno. 80p. Keys to all 82 known European species (males, females and larvae).

External links

Family description and image 
Picture 
The Types of Fanniidae and Muscidae (Diptera) in the Museum für Naturkunde, Humboldt-Universität zu Berlin, Germany

Species lists
Nearctic
West Palaearctic including Russia
Australasian/Oceanian
Japan 

 
Brachycera families
Taxa named by Charles Henry Tyler Townsend